Pietro Barbolano (sometimes Pietro Barbo Centranico) was the 28th Doge of Venice. Reportedly a descendant of the legendary Eraclea (after whom the town near Venice is named), he was elected by the assembly of the nobles after the deposition of his predecessor, Otto Orseolo. The dates of his birth and death are unknown.

Doge of Venice

Barbolano's reign occurred during a rather difficult time in Venice. The people had spoken out against hereditary monarchy when they deposed Otto Orseolo following the scandals over nepotism. He was never fully able to win over the Venetians as he was not nearly as charismatic as the two previous Doges from the Orseolo family. For the four years of his reign, he struggled to bring the city back together, but he could not. Because the Orseoli had created so many links between their family and the hereditary ruling dynasties of Europe, various actions were taken against Venice as a retaliation for deposing Otto Orseolo. The Byzantine Emperor not only took Otto Orseolo in as a relative (in fact, he was), but he also withdrew the trading privileges granted to Pietro Orseolo in 992. He tried to obtain from the Holy Roman Emperor, Conrad II, a renewal of Venetian commercial privileges that had been granted to them by Otto III, but he was not able to do so. In the meantime, King Stephen of Hungary, whose sister Grimelda of Hungary was the wife of Otto Orseolo, attacked Dalmatia and annexed a number of cities that had been captured by Pietro II.

The Republic appeared to be collapsing and many people went back to supporting Otto Orseolo, though not the Orseolo family as hereditary rulers. In 1032, Pietro Barbolano abdicated under heavy pressure and Otto Orseolo was called back to rule from his exile in Constantinople. However, when the messengers got there, Otto was approaching his death causing Domenico Orseolo, his relative in Venice, to attempt to seize power. This bold action was extremely ill-received in Venice as the populace displayed its animosity for the notion that an Orseolo was somehow entitled to the Dogeship. Barbolano's successor was chosen in 1032 to be the wealthy merchant Domenico Flabanico, who had few noble ties, to spite the idea of creating a royal family in Venice.

The Venetian noble Salamon family, one of the oldest patrician houses of the Republic of Venice, according to some sources would descend from the Centranico-Barbolano family through the Doge Pietro, who was the first to assume this surname.

See also
List of Doges of Venice

References
Rendina, Claudio (2007), I dogi. Storia e segreti, ed. Newton Compton, Roma. 
Da Mosto, Andrea (2003), I dogi di Venezia, ed. Giunti, Firenze.
Castagnetti, Andrea (1992), Famiglie e affermazione politica, in Storia di Venezia, vol. I, Origini - Età ducale, ed. Istituto dell'Enciclopedia italiana, Roma.

Notes

11th-century deaths
11th-century Doges of Venice
Year of birth unknown